Amanda Coetzer and Linda Harvey-Wild were the defending champions but only Harvey-Wild competed that year with Chanda Rubin.

Harvey-Wild and Rubin won in the final 6–7, 6–3, 6–2 against Maria Lindström and Maria Strandlund.

Seeds
Champion seeds are indicated in bold text while text in italics indicates the round in which those seeds were eliminated.

 Linda Harvey-Wild /  Chanda Rubin (champions)
 Maria Lindström /  Maria Strandlund (final)
 Åsa Carlsson /  Alexandra Fusai (first round)
 Catherine Barclay /  Kristin Godridge (semifinals)

Draw

External links
 1995 Prague Open Doubles draw

1995 - Doubles
Doubles